St Michael's is a co-educational Anglican private primary and intermediate day school situated in the city centre of Christchurch, New Zealand. The school provides an education for year zero to year eight. It is associated with the Church of St Michael and All Angels.

Three of the buildings and structures are registered with the New Zealand Historic Places Trust as heritage items. The church building is registered as a Category I structure. The belfry of the church, built in 1861 and designed by Benjamin Mountfort, is also recognised as a Category I structure. The 1912 Stone School Building, designed by Cecil Wood, is registered as a Category II building.

See also
List of schools in the Canterbury Region

References

External links

 St Michaels Church School website

Anglican schools in New Zealand
Primary schools in Christchurch
Christchurch Central City
Heritage New Zealand Category 1 historic places in Canterbury, New Zealand
Heritage New Zealand Category 2 historic places in Canterbury, New Zealand
Benjamin Mountfort buildings
1910s architecture in New Zealand
Educational institutions established in 1851